The 2023 Southeastern Louisiana Lady Lions softball team represents Southeastern Louisiana University during the 2023 NCAA Division I softball season. The Lady Lions play their home games at North Oak Park in Hammond, LA and are led by eighth-year head coach Rick Fremin. They are members of the Southland Conference.

Preseason

Southland Conference Coaches Poll
The Southland Conference Coaches Poll was released on January 26, 2023. Southeastern Louisiana was picked to finish second in the Southland Conference with 113 overall votes and 2 first place votes.

Preseason All-Southland team
Four Lady Lions were named to the conference preseason first team, and one player was named as a second team member.

First Team
Crislyne Moreno (MCNS, SO, 1st Base)
Caleigh Cross  (MCNS, SR, 2nd Base)
Jil Poullard (MCNS, JR, 3rd Base)
Maddie Watson (SELA, SO, Shortstop)
Bailey Krolczyk (SELA, JR, Catcher)
Kaylee Lopez (MCNS, SR, Utility)
Audrey Greely (SELA, JR, Designated Player)
Laney Roos (NSU, JR, Outfielder)
Alayis Seneca (MCNS, SR, Outfielder)
Cam Goodman (SELA, JR, Outfielder)
Ashley Vallejo (MCNS, JR, Pitcher)
Bronte Rhoden (NSU, SR, Pitcher)

Second Team
Sydney Hoyt (TAMUCC, JR, 1st Base)
Madison Rayner (SELA, SR, 2nd Base)
Haylie Savage (HCU, SO, 3rd Base)
Ryleigh Mata (UIW, SO, Shortstop)
Tristin Court (NSU, JR, Catcher)
Melise Gossen (NICH, SR, Utility)
Chloe Gomez (MCNS, JR, Designated Player)
Alexa Poche (NICH, JR, Outfielder)
Makenzie Chaffin (NSU, JR, Outfielder)
Bailie Ragsdale (NSU, SO, Outfielder)
Lyndie Swanson (HCU, JR, Pitcher)
Siarah Galvan  (TAMUCC, SO, Pitcher)

National Softball Signing Day

Personnel

Schedule and results

Schedule Source:*Rankings are based on the team's current ranking in the NFCA/USA Softball poll.

References

Southeastern Louisiana
Southeastern Louisiana Lady Lions softball
Southeastern Louisiana Lady Lions softball